The Queen's Birthday Honours 2010 for Australia were announced on 13 June 2010.

† indicates an award given posthumously.

Order of Australia

Companion (AC)

General Division

Officer (AO)

General Division

Military Division

Member (AM)

General Division

Military Division

Medal (OAM)

General Division

Military Division

Public Service Medal (PSM)

Australian Police Medal (APM)

Australian Fire Service Medal (AFSM)

Ambulance Service Medal (ASM)

Emergency Services Medal (ESM)

Commendation for Gallantry

Distinguished Service Medal (DSM)

Commendation for Distinguished Service

Bar to the Conspicuous Service Cross

Conspicuous Service Cross (CSC)

Conspicuous Service Medal (CSM)

References
Queen's Birthday 2010 Honours Lists, Governor-General of Australia: The Australian Honours Secretariat

2010 awards
Orders, decorations, and medals of Australia
2010 awards in Australia